Newark is an unincorporated community in Marshall County, in the U.S. state of South Dakota.

History
Newark was laid out in 1884, and named after Newark, New Jersey. A post office called Newark was established in 1883, and remained in operation until 1958.

References

Unincorporated communities in Marshall County, South Dakota
Unincorporated communities in South Dakota